Darwinivelia is a genus of true bugs belonging to the family Mesoveliidae.

Species:

Darwinivelia angulata 
Darwinivelia fosteri 
Darwinivelia polhemi

References

Mesoveliidae